The Cottonwood Paper Mill (also known as Granite Paper Mill) is an abandoned stone structure located at the mouth of Big Cottonwood Canyon in Cottonwood Heights, Utah.  It was listed on the National Register of Historic Places in 1971.

It was built in 1883 by the Deseret News under the direction of Henry Grow. Workers used paper making equipment brought in from the old Sugar House Paper Mill to grind logs from nearby canyons into pulp. Rags gathered from old clothes were also used to produce the pulp, which was then placed into molds and dried. During its operation, the mill could yield up to 5 tons of paper per day.

The mill provided jobs and paper for nearly ten years.; the railroad increased the demand for cheaper paper manufactured outside the area. In 1892, the Cottonwood Paper Mill was sold to Granite Paper Mills Company. On April 1, 1893, a fire broke out among its indoor stored stockpile of paper. Many hearing the alarm thought it an April Fools' Day prank. All that remained following the fire was a stone skeleton.

The structure was partially rebuilt in 1927 for use as an open-air dance hall, known as the Old Mill Club, and remained so until the 1940s. In the late 1960s, rock bands played there on Friday and Saturday nights. It was also used in the 1970s and 1980s as a haunted house and a craft boutique. It was declared a historic site by the Daughters of the Utah Pioneers in 1966, and was condemned by the city of Cottonwood Heights in 2005.

See also
 National Register of Historic Places listings in Salt Lake County, Utah

References

 The Deseret News Company's Paper Mill, Deseret News, October 15, 1884
 Burned to the Ground, Davis County Clipper, April 6, 1893
 The Paper Mill, Deseret News, April 8, 1893
 Paper=Making in Utah, Salt Lake Tribune, August 14, 1898 (Includes sketches of the mill during operation, and in ruins.)
 Making Paper Early Industry, "Raise in Price of Commodity Revives Interest in a Proposition Now Dead", Deseret Evening News, February 1, 1908
 Old Mill Will Become Resort, The Ogden Standard Examiner, May 12, 1927
 The Daughters of Utah Pioneers Meet at Historic Old Paper Mill, by Sarah Brockbank, Murray Eagle, June 30, 1932
 Cottonwood Stake Gold-Green Ball at Old Mill Club, The Murray Eagle, January 10, 1935
 The Old Mill Club, "The Finest in Entertainment Dancing," The Murray Eagle, June 27, 1935
 Firemen Busy this Week, Murray Eagle, July 11, 1935 – Mention of a fire at the Old Mill Club
 Old Mill Has Weathered Many Hardships Since 1881, Jack Goodman, Salt Lake Tribune, February 23, 1992 (requires logon)
 The Back Pages – Snapshots of Utah History..., Karen Dunlap, Salt Lake Tribune, September 9, 2001
 Old Mill Lives On, by Judy Fahys, Salt Lake Tribune, June 29, 2006 (requires logon)
 Cottonwood Heights History from the city's official website, recounts the history of the mill.
 Deseret News Timeline, mentions the construction and destruction of the mill
 Rag Mission article by Daughters of the Utah Pioneers, regarding paper production in Utah.
 Old Clothes turned into paper, article by the Deseret News, discussing the use of the mill
 Utah History to Go article
 Thieves make away with $20,000 of copper wiring from Old Mill, Alex Cabrero, KSL.com, November 17, 2011
 Historic American Buildings Survey, C.W. Barrow, Jr., September 1967. Includes a written description of the mill, its construction, ownership and use, and photographs from that period.
 Photograph, circa 1869 by C.R. Savage, from L. Tom Perry Special History Library

Industrial buildings completed in 1883
Buildings and structures in Cottonwood Heights, Utah
Commercial buildings on the National Register of Historic Places in Utah
Industrial buildings and structures in Utah
Industrial buildings and structures on the National Register of Historic Places in Utah
Pulp and paper mills in the United States
National Register of Historic Places in Salt Lake County, Utah
Deseret News
1883 establishments in Utah Territory